Nicole Kortlüke (born 9 March 1976) is a German film editor.

Career
Kortlüke worked as assistant editor for productions such as Speer und Er, Emma's Bliss and films of the German crime series Tatort. From 2002 to 2005 she studied film editing at International Film School Cologne. Since 2006, she has been a film school teacher.

Since 2006, Kortlüke has been editing cinema and television films as well as series. This includes the films Rendezvous with Death, Losing Balance and Alive and Ticking by Andi Rogenhagen, which ran in 2011 in the competition of the Shanghai International Film Festival.

Her work on the documentary Farewell Herr Schwarz proved invaluable in making the film tell its story. "In a certain way, the script was written in the editing room," director Yael Reuveny said.
Regarding the editing Frankfurter Rundschau called it "a thoughtful documentary that takes the time necessary to dismantle the myths and track their impact." "This film would be the ideal theater of tomorrow," wrote Andreas Platthaus in Frankfurter Allgemeine Zeitung, calling it a masterpiece. The film was widely critically acclaimed.

Personal life
Kortlüke lives in Cologne, Germany.

Selected filmography

 2003: Frauenparkplatz
 2005: Mittsommer
 2005: Rendezvous with Death (Rendezvous mit dem Tod: Warum John F. Kennedy sterben musste)
 2006: Poldis Engel
 2006: Hilfe! Hochzeit! – Die schlimmste Woche meines Lebens
 2009: A Triangle Dialogue – Tales of the Defeated
 2009: Draußen am See
 2009: Franks Welt
 2010: Jabhook
 2010: Zeche is nich – Sieben Blicke auf das Ruhrgebiet 2010
 2011: Ein Tick anders
 2012: Brüder
 2012: Spielzeit
 2012: Pommes essen
 2012: Mobbing
 2012: Du hast es versprochen
 2013: Heiter bis tödlich: Zwischen den Zeilen
 2013: Farewell Herr Schwarz
 2013: Es ist alles in Ordnung
 2014: Herzensbrecher – Vater von vier Söhnen
 2014: The Chambermaid Lynn
 2015: We Monsters
 2016: 
 2018: Wendy 2 – Freundschaft für immer
 2019: Das Institut – Oase des Scheiterns
 2019: Zu weit weg

References

External links
 

1976 births
German film editors
20th-century German women artists
21st-century German women artists
German women film editors
Film people from Cologne
People from Rheda-Wiedenbrück
Living people